MMSE can refer to:

 Mini-Mental State Examination, a questionnaire to measure cognitive impairment
 Minimum mean square error, an estimation method that minimizes the mean square error
 Multimedia Messaging Service Environment, the servers in a mobile telephony network required for Multimedia Messaging Service messaging.